M23, M.23 or M-23 may refer to:

Roads
 M23 motorway, a motorway in England
 M-23 (Michigan highway), a highway designation formerly used in Michigan
 Highway M23 (Ukraine)
 M23 (Cape Town), a Metropolitan Route in Cape Town, South Africa
 M23 (Pretoria), a Metropolitan Route in Pretoria, South Africa
 Federal Highway (Australia), part of which is given the designation "M23"

Other uses
 M23 (New York City bus), a New York City Bus route in Manhattan
 BFW M.23, two-seater sports plane
 HMS M23, a Royal Navy 
 The Mathieu group M23 in the mathematical field of group theory
 M23 chemical mine, a US landmine
 m23 software distribution system, a Linux software distribution and management system
 McLaren M23, a race car
 Messier 23 (M23), an open star cluster in the constellation Sagittarius
 March 23 Movement (M23), a rebel group operating in the Democratic Republic of the Congo
 M23 rebellion, a conflict involving the group
 M23 derby, a football association match between Brighton and Hove Albion and Crystal Palace

Road disambiguation pages